The governor of North Carolina is the head of government of the U.S. state of North Carolina. Seventy people have held the office since its inception in 1776. The governor serves a term of four year and chairs the collective body of the state's elected executive officials, the Council of State. The governor's powers and responsibilities are prescribed by the state constitution and by law. They serve as the North Carolina's chief executive and are tasked by the constitution with faithfully carrying out the laws of the state. They are ex officio commander in chief of the North Carolina National Guard and director of the state budget. The office has extensive powers of appointment of executive branch officials, some judges, and members of boards and commissions. Governors are also empowered to grant pardons and veto legislation.

Historically, North Carolina has had a weak governor with limited authority. Unlike most of their contemporaries in the United States, the North Carolina governor lacks line-item veto power, while additional executive authority is vested in other elected officials on the Council of State. While the state has grown increasingly politically competitive since the mid-20th century, Republicans have had difficulty in winning gubernatorial elections in North Carolina, and the office has usually remained in Democratic hands. The current governor, Democrat Roy Cooper, took office on January 1, 2017.

History of the office

Colonial antecedent 
The office of governor is the oldest public office in the state of North Carolina. Historians trace its origins to the appointment of Ralph Lane as the governor of the Roanoke Colony in 1585. From 1622 to 1731 the Province of Carolina/Province of North Carolina had governors appointed by the colony's lords proprietors. From then until 1774 the governors were chosen by the British Crown. The governors during these times were politically weak executives and generally conformed to the wishes of their appointers. They were aided in the execution of their office by the Governor's Council, an advisory board of appointed officials that also collectively served as the upper house in the North Carolina General Assembly. After 1731, the councilors were chosen by the Privy Council and were responsible to the British King, further diluting the governor's authority.

During the period of royal control after 1731, North Carolina's governors were issued sets of secret instructions from the Privy Council's Board of Trade. The directives were binding upon the governor and dealt with nearly all aspects of colonial government. As they were produced by officials largely ignorant of the political situation in the colony and  meant to ensure greater direct control over the territory, the instructions caused tensions between the governor and the General Assembly. The assembly controlled the colony's finances and used this as leverage by withholding salaries and appropriations, sometimes forcing the governors to compromise and disregard some of the Board of Trade's instructions. Frequent tensions between Governor Josiah Martin—a firm supporter of the instructions—and the Assembly in the 1770s led the latter to established a committee of correspondence and accelerated the colony's break with Great Britain.

Establishment and antebellum period 
The state of North Carolina's first constitution in 1776 provided for a governor to be elected by a joint vote of both houses of the General Assembly to serve a one-year term. They were limited to serving no more than three terms within a six-year period. The constitution also provided for a legislatively-determined Council of State to "advise the Governor in the execution of his office". In practice, the Council of State limited the governor's executive authority, as sometimes the governor was required to get their approval before taking a course of action. From its inception, the office of governor in North Carolina was weak in its powers, largely restricted out of fear of the actions taken by British colonial governors. Richard Caswell was chosen by the General Assembly to serve as the independent state's first governor.

In 1835 the constitution was amended to allow for the popular election of the governor to a two-year term, thus giving the office more political independence from the legislature. The holder of the office was restricted to no more than two terms within a six-year period. Edward Bishop Dudley became the first popularly-elected governor.

1868 constitution 
In 1868 North Carolina ratified a new constitution which extended the governor's term of office to four years but limited the holder to one term. Under the 1868 constitution, the governor's executive power was derived from the following provision: "The executive department shall consist of a governor, in whom shall be invested the supreme executive power of the State." The new constitution also granted the governor appointive powers. The Council of State was revised to include several other popularly-elected executive officials serving ex officio. Under the constitution, the governor called and presided over the council's meetings but was not a formal member of the body. In 1871 Governor William Woods Holden was impeached and removed from office. Holden was the first governor in the United States to ever be removed in such a fashion and is the only North Carolina governor to ever be impeached.

Constitutional and legislative enhancements 
In 1925 the Executive Budget Act was passed, designating the governor as the director of the state budget. During the tenure of Governor O. Max Gardner from 1929 to 1933, various reforms led to the centralization of governmental services and the creation of additional appointive offices, thus increasing the authority and importance of the governorship. In 1933 the General Assembly approved a referendum to consider amending the constitution to grant the governor veto power over legislation, but the amendment effort failed due to technical concerns. The new constitution of 1971 stipulated that "The executive power of the State shall be invested in the Governor", making the official unambiguously the chief executive of the state. The constitution also affirmed the governor's role as the director of the state budget and made them a formal ex officio member of the Council of State.

Until an amendment was added to the state constitution in 1977, North Carolina governors could only serve a single four-year term and could not run for re-election. This amendment strengthened the political authority of the office. Following a 1995 referendum resulting in a constitutional amendment, in 1996 the governor was granted veto power, becoming the last governor in the country to be given this power. Mike Easley became the first North Carolina governor to veto legislation after rejecting a bill in 2002. While institutional enhancements increased the formal power of the governorship over the course of the 20th century, this was counteracted by a corresponding rise in the legislature's growing willingness to assert its separate desires in state policy. In 2016 the General Assembly significantly curtailed the number of appointments which could be made by the governor. The incumbent governor is Roy Cooper, a Democrat who assumed office on January 1, 2017. He is the 75th person to hold the office.

Election 

As with other state officials, only qualified voters in North Carolina are eligible to be elected governor. Unlike most other candidates, who must be at least 21 years of age, any potential governor must be at least 30 years of age. They must also have been a citizen of the United States for at least five years and a resident of North Carolina for at least two years preceding election. The governor is elected in 1972 and every four years thereafter. They serve for a four-year term and until their successor has assumed office. Contested elections for the office of governor are resolved by a majority vote of the General Assembly.

The governor's term of office begins on January 1 following their election, but they may not exercise the duties of the office until delivering and undersigning the oath or affirmation of office before a justice of the North Carolina Supreme Court. The oath, which is identical for all state officials, is prescribed by the Article VI Section 7 of the constitution. Since 1877, new governors have often sworn their oaths in public inaugural ceremonies which are accompanied by celebratory balls and parades. They typically receive the Great Seal of the State North Carolina from the outgoing incumbent in a private meeting. The governor is limited to serving two consecutive terms in office, with no limits on nonconsecutive terms. In the event the governor-elect fails to qualify for their office, the lieutenant governor-elect becomes governor. The lieutenant governor is elected at the same time as the governor but on their own ticket.

Powers and duties

Executive authority and responsibilities 
The powers and duties of the governor of North Carolina are derived from the Constitution of North Carolina and state statutes. The governor is the chief executive of the state and is tasked by the constitution with faithfully carrying out the laws of the state. The governor is empowered to request agency heads in state government to report to them in writing on subjects relating to executive duties. They are authorized by the constitution to reorganize executive agencies by executive order submitted to the General Assembly, which have "the force of law" unless expressly disapproved by the assembly. They are ex officio commander in chief of the North Carolina National Guard—except when the guard is placed into federal service—and are authorized to call it into service "to execute the law". They are empowered to grant pardons and commutations to convicted criminals and serve as the state's chief representative in intergovernmental matters. They are responsible for reviewing extradition requests from other states and issuing a governor's warrant to detain persons for extradition. The constitution makes the governor the director of the state budget. In this capacity, the governor has the responsibility of monitoring revenue and expenditures to ensure the state maintains a balanced budget and preparing budget recommendations for the General Assembly, which can disregard the proposals in creating the state budget. The governor also administers grants and loans provided by the federal government to the state.

The office has extensive powers of appointment of executive branch officials, some judges, and members of boards and commissions. As of 2023, the governor is responsible for over 2,400 appointments to over 350 boards and commissions. Most executive appointments are not subject to legislative consent and many appointees serve at the pleasure of the governor. Some appointments to major state boards, including the State Board of Education and the North Carolina Utilities Commission, require confirmation from either one or both houses of the General Assembly. Cabinet secretaries are subject to confirmation from the State Senate. The governor is empowered to appoint interim officials to any vacant Council of State offices aside from the Lieutenant Governor of North Carolina without legislative assent pending the next state legislative election. They also may fill vacant judicial offices unless otherwise directed by law. Some appointments to state boards are reserved for other state officials, and the governor's ability to remove officials has been limited by courts. The constitution also allows the governor to devolve some responsibilities upon the lieutenant governor at their discretion.

Legislative authority and responsibilities 

The governor is constitutionally obligated to "give the General Assembly information of the affairs of the State and recommend to their consideration such measures as he shall deem expedient". Governors traditionally fulfill this requirement with a "State of the State" speech delivered during the legislature's opening session, though they can also communicate this information through separate special messages. They are empowered to veto bills of the General Assembly. A veto can be overridden by a three-fifths majority vote of the assembly. The governor may call the General Assembly into extraordinary session after consulting the Council of State and is required to convene the assembly in specific circumstances to review vetoed legislation.

Other duties 

The governor is one of 10 constitutionally-designated members of the Council of State, a collection of elected state executives, and chairs its meetings. The body has minimal constitutional duties, with its most significant responsibilities arising from statute, including approving the governor's acquisitions and disposals of state property. The governor is tasked by the constitution with keeping the Great Seal of the State North Carolina. The constitution empowers the governor to permit the state or a local government to incur a debt without a referendum in the event of an emergency threat to public health or safety.

The governor is constitutionally required to live at the seat of state government. Since 1891, the Executive Mansion in Raleigh has served as the official residence of the governor of North Carolina and their family. Governors and their immediate family—called the "first family" during the executive's tenure—serve as symbolic leaders for the state. As the ceremonial head of the state, the governor often attends official events and performs formal functions on behalf of the state, such as meeting with important persons and leading ribbon-cutting ceremonies.

Capacity, removal, and succession

In the event of the governor's absence from North Carolina, or their physical or mental incapacity, the lieutenant governor is tasked with serving as "Acting Governor". In the event of the governor's death, resignation, or removal, the lieutenant governor or whoever next available in the line of succession shall assume the governorship to complete the full term to which the original governor was elected. Constitutionally, physical incapacity can only be determined by the governor themselves; they may write to the North Carolina Attorney General that they are physically incapable of performing their duties. They can resume their duties after informing the attorney general that they are physically capable. The Council of State has the ability by majority vote to call the General Assembly into an extraordinary session to consider the governor's mental capacity. The General Assembly can declare the governor mentally incapable with a two-third majority vote on a joint resolution. The assembly is required to give the governor notice of this consideration and allow them to express their own opinion on their capacity before a vote.

Aside from states of mental or physical incapacity, the only other constitutional reason to remove the governor is their commission of an impeachable offense. In the event that the governor is impeached by the North Carolina House of Representatives, the chief justice of the North Carolina Supreme Court presides over the court of impeachment. The court is composed of the State Senate, with a majority of its members serving as a quorum. While the court is engaged in its proceedings, the impeached governor is temporarily suspended from their duties. A two-thirds affirmative vote of the senators present constitutes a conviction and thus removal and future disqualification from holding office.

North Carolina's line of gubernatorial succession is by enumerated in Article III, Section 3 of the Constitution of North Carolina and General Statutes Section 147.11.1. The line of succession passes sequentially as follows: first to the Lieutenant Governor, then the President pro tempore of the Senate, then the Speaker of the House of Representatives, then the Secretary of State, then the State Auditor, then the State Treasurer, then the Superintendent of Public Instruction, then the Attorney General, then the Commissioner of Agriculture, then the Commissioner of Labor, and finally the Commissioner of Insurance.

Office structure 

The governor's office is in the State Capitol. Regional offices are located in New Bern and Asheville to reach local governments and residents in the eastern and western portions of the state, respectively. The Asheville office also oversees management of the governor's western residence. Another office is maintained in Washington D.C. to serve as a liaison between North Carolina's government and the state's congressional delegation and the federal government. As with all Council of State officers, the governor's salary is fixed by the General Assembly and cannot be reduced during their term of office. In 2022, the governor's annual salary was $165,750.

The secretaries which lead executive departments under the governor's purview collectively form the state cabinet. The governor's office employs a senior staff, which assist the governor in their management of the cabinet and offer advice in legislative matters. The governor appoints a legal counsel who advises the governor, their cabinet, and the Council of State. The counsel also provides advice regarding legal policy matters and investigates the merits of pardons and commutations. The Office of State Budget and Management prepares the state budget and advises the governor on budgetary affairs. The Boards and Commissions Office advises the governor on their appointments. The Communications Office employs spokespersons for the governor and prepares press releases, speeches, and public events for them. The Policy Office crafts and considers the governors' main executive and legislative policy goals. The Education Policy Office does the same with a focus on educational matters. The Office of Constituent Services fields citizen inquires and correspondence. The Office of Citizen and Faith Outreach handles matters concerning minority groups and religion. The Legislative Affairs Office acts as a liaison between the governor and the General Assembly and reports on the progression of legislation. The Governmental Relations Office serves as a liaison between the state government, local governments, and the federal government.

Political dynamics

Political role 
Governors usually informally serve as the state leader of whatever political party to which they belong. They often have the ability to influence the selection of other party leaders, offer endorsements to candidates, and serve as a spokesman for their organization. As a prominent elected official, the governor also wields agenda-setting authority.

Trends in officeholders 
Between 1877 and 1972 all of North Carolina's governors were Democrats, with the exception of Republican Daniel L. Russell, who won a single term to office in 1896. As Republican strength grew in North Carolina after 1950, the state's gubernatorial elections became increasingly competitive. In 1972 James Holshouser was elected as the state's first Republican governor of the 20th century. Even so, Republicans have still had difficulty in winning gubernatorial elections in North Carolina, and the office has usually remained in Democratic hands. Beginning in the latter half of the 20th century, Democratic gubernatorial candidates have regularly outperformed their presidential counterparts. Republican gubernatorial candidates have generally attempted to link their efforts with Republican presidential campaigns, while Democratic candidates have usually placed more distance between themselves and their associated presidential contenders.

The vast majority of people who have been elected Governor of North Carolina have been male, white, Protestant Christian, born and raised in a rural North Carolinian environment, about 50 years of age, politically experienced, attorneys, and college educated. Bev Perdue, elected in 2008, was the first woman to serve as governor of North Carolina. Incumbents tend to win reelection. Jim Hunt was the state's longest serving governor with four terms in office, serving from 1977 to 1985 and 1993 to 2001.

Weaknesses of powers 
While North Carolina's governor has stronger appointive abilities than most of their contemporaries around the United States, the office has less overall institutional power compared to governors in other states. Their veto power is weaker than that of most of their contemporaries. It  can be overridden by a three-fifths majority legislative vote, slimmer than the two-thirds majority usually required in most states. Unlike governors in 43 other states, the North Carolina governor does not have line-item veto power. They are also prohibited from vetoing joint resolutions of the legislature, local bills, and amendments to the state and federal constitutions. The separate election of other state executive officials on the Council of State draws authority away from the governorship. By law, the governor requires the council's approval for certain acquisitions and disposals of state property. Increasing two-party competitiveness in North Carolina from the 1970s onward and the occurrence of divided government—when the party which controls the legislature is different than that of the governor's affiliation—have also weakened the chief executive's political effectiveness.

Lists 

List of governors of North Carolina (1712–1776)
List of governors of North Carolina

References

Works cited 
 
 
 
 
 
 
 
 

1776 establishments in North Carolina